Kalyanam Panniyum Brahmachari is a 1954 Indian Tamil-language comedy film, directed by P. Neelakantan and produced by B. R. Panthulu. The film stars T. R. Ramachandran, Sivaji Ganesan, Padmini and Ragini. It was released on 13 April 1954 and became a box office success.

Plot

Cast 
T. R. Ramachandran as Ganapathy
Sivaji Ganesan as Ambalavanan
Padmini as Padmini
Ragini as Savithri
K. D. Santhanam as Balasundaram
M. A. Ganapathy
M. N. Krishnan
T. K. Kalyanam
Krishna Bai
Saradambal
Hariharan, Dhanam

Production 
Kalyanam Panniyum Brahmachari was written and directed by P. Neelakantan, and produced by B. R. Panthulu under Padmini Pictures. The film became embroiled in a plagiarism controversy; playwright Vedam Venkataraya Sastri accused the makers of lifting the plot from his Telugu play Vyamoham. A notice was sent via lawyer N. K. Mohanrangam Pillai to Panthulu, who offered compensation to Sastri to avoid creating trouble before the film's release. Sastri wanted his name to be shown in the film's credits, but this request was outrightly refused by Panthulu. Sastri filed a copyright infringement case with Mohanrangam Pillai as his lawyer, but ultimately lost the case even after appealing. A few sequences from the 1952 Bengali film Pasher Bari were reported to have been copied in bits in this film.

Soundtrack 
The music was composed by T. G. Lingappa and the lyrics were written by Bharathidasan and K. D. Santhanam. T

The song "Jolly Life Jolly Life" which actor J. P. Chandrababu had sung as playback for Sivaji Ganesan, and "Vennilavum Vaanum Pole" became popular.

Release and reception 
Kalyanam Panniyum Brahmachari was released on 13 April 1954, and distributed by Madras Pictures. Thought wrote, "This Padmini Pictures release confirms that Tamil films require a good deal of 'polishing up.' They lack just that quality to be aesthetically perfect." The film was successful at box office and established Ramachandran as one of the famous comedians in Tamil cinema.

References

External links 
 

1950s Tamil-language films
1954 films
Films directed by P. Neelakantan
Films involved in plagiarism controversies
Films scored by T. G. Lingappa
Indian black-and-white films
Indian comedy films
1954 comedy films